Independent School District 318 is a school district located in Itasca County, Minnesota, United States, that operates public primary and secondary schools within the district.  The district serves the communities of  Balsam, Bigfork, Cohasset, Effie, Grand Rapids, Squaw Lake, Togo, Warba and Wawina. The current superintendent is Matt Grose who was hired in 2020.

Schools
Grand Rapids High School
Bigfork School (K-12 School)
Robert J. Elkington Middle School
Cohasset Elementary
Forest Lake Elementary
Murphy Elementary
Southwest Elementary

ISD 318 School Board

Chairman- Pat Medure
Clerk- Molly Miskovich
Treasurer- Malissa Bahr
Director- Sue Zeige
Director- David Marty
Director- Mindy Nuhring

See also
List of school districts in Minnesota

References

External links
 

School districts in Minnesota
Education in Itasca County, Minnesota